This article displays the women qualifying draw of the 2011 Barcelona Ladies Open.

Players

Seeds

Qualifiers

Lucky losers
  Jamie Hampton
  Maria Elena Camerin

Qualifying draw

First qualifier

Second qualifier

Third qualifier

Fourth qualifier

References
 Qualifying Draw

qualifying